Atlantica-Séguier (Created in 1984) is a French publishing house.

Background
Created in 1984, the company has published more than 2,300 works which include fiction and non-fiction books as well as plays. The non-fiction focus is mainly on cinema, the theater, and painting as well as some specialty sports such as bullfighting. The company is headquartered in Biarritz, France and Paris, France.

Works
Works published by Atlantica-Séguier include:
Gabriel Dupont (1878–1914) ou La Mélancolie du Bonheur, by Philippe Simon
Gibraltar, roisée de mondes et Gibraltar, improbable frontière by Zakya Daoud
Les Cadavres Hilares, by Lily Bloom
 Maurice Duruflé : Souvenirs et autres écrits, by Frédéric Blan

References

Book publishing companies of France
Mass media in Biarritz